The Hawthorne Derby is an American Thoroughbred horse race held annually since 1965 at Hawthorne Race Course in Stickney/Cicero, Illinois, near Chicago. Raced in October, it is open to three-year-old horses. It is contested for a purse of $250,000 over a distance of  miles on turf.

Inaugurated as the Hawthorne Diamond Jubilee in 1965 (through 1968), it was run on dirt until 1984 when it was switched to the turf course. The John R. Gaines colt Bold Bidder won the inaugural race then the following year returned to the Hawthorne Race Course to win the 1966 Hawthorne Gold Cup.

From inception, the Hawthorne Derby has been run at various distances. Since 1989 it has been set at a mile and one eighth. In 1979 the race was run at the now closed Sportsman's Park.

The Race Was Not Run In 2014, 2016, 2018, 2019, & 2020.

Records
Time records:

(At current distance of  miles turf)
 1:44.70 Rainbows For Life (1991) 
(A course record which still stands)
(At the prior distance of  miles dirt)
 1:39.60 Sensitive Prince (1978)
(A track record which still stands)

Winners of the Hawthorne Derby since 1999

In 2002, Flying Dash won the race but was disqualified for use of medications banned in the state of Illinois

Earlier winners 

 1998 – Stay Sound
 1997 – River Squall
 1996 – Jaunatxo
 1995 – Cuzzin Jeb
 1994 – Chrysalis House
 1993 – Snake Eyes
 1992 – Bantan
 1991 – Rainbows For Life
 1990 – Tutu Tobago
 1989 – Broto
 1988 – Pappas Swing
 1987 – Zaizoom
 1986 – Autobot
 1985 – Derby Wish
 1984 – Pass The Line 
 1983 – St. Forbes
 1982 – Drop Your Drawers
 1981 – Jeremy Jet
 1980 – Jaklin Klugman 
 1979 – Architect
 1978 – Sensitive Prince
 1977 – Silver series
 1976 – Wardlaw
 1975 – Winter Fox
 1974 – Stonewalk
 1973 – Golden Don
 1972 – Feloniously
 1971 – Northfields
 1970 – Well Mannered
 1969 – Oil Power
 1968 – Te Vega
 1967 – Gentleman James
 1966 – Handsome Boy
 1965 – Bold Bidder

References

Flat horse races for three-year-olds
Graded stakes races in the United States
1965 establishments in Illinois
Turf races in the United States
Hawthorne Race Course
Horse races in Illinois
Recurring sporting events established in 1965